Eric Peter Gilbert (born 31 July 1983), known as Peter Gilbert, is a Welsh former footballer and current coach.

A defender, Gilbert played in the Football League for Plymouth Argyle, Leicester City, Sheffield Wednesday, Doncaster Rovers, Oldham Athletic, Northampton Town and Southend United, also appearing in the Conference for Lincoln City and briefly in the Northern Premier League for Goole. He represented Wales at under-21 level.

Gilbert is currently coaching Aston Villa Under-21s.

Career
Gilbert began his career at Birmingham City as a trainee but failed to make a first team appearance. He did captain the academy side during his time with the Blues and made many appearances for the reserves. His progress was hampered by a serious knee injury. Once he recovered the decision was made to make a fresh start at another club. He joined Plymouth Argyle at the beginning of the 2003–04 season on loan, where his performances earned him a permanent move. Once he signed, Gilbert soon proved himself to be a reliable and steady player and was a mainstay of Argyle's Second Division championship-winning side, playing 40 league games and scoring one goal against Tranmere Rovers. His only other goal for Plymouth came three days after his goal against Tranmere in a Football League Trophy tie against Bristol City.

This run of form led him to be called up to the Welsh under-21 squad and receiving his first cap. He went on to make 10 appearances in the 2006 UEFA Under-21 Championship qualifying campaign. During this campaign he impressed head coach John Toshack enough to consider him for the senior squad, and was a member of Toshack's senior squad for a six-day training camp in Spain at the end of the 2004–05 season.

He made 38 appearances for Argyle in the Championship during 2004–05. This led to interest from Leicester City manager Craig Levein who signed Gilbert for the start of the 2005–06 season, for a fee in the region of £200,000.

However, Gilbert made just six appearances for Leicester before being loaned to fellow Championship side Sheffield Wednesday in November 2005. He joined Wednesday on a permanent basis in 2006 and, following three years at the club, his contract was terminated by mutual consent on 6 April 2009.

After trials with Huddersfield Town, Southend United and Coventry City, Gilbert joined Oldham Athletic on a short-term contract. However, because the player wanted more stability than was afforded by the week-to-week deal with Oldham, he left before the 1 September transfer deadline to allow him the chance to find a permanent club.

In September 2009, Gilbert had a trial with Conference National side Mansfield Town. After a two-week trial spell in which he played the whole of a reserve game, he signed for League Two club Northampton Town in November until the end of the 2009–10 season.

On 8 July 2010 Gilbert signed a pre contract agreement with Southend United due to the club being under a transfer embargo, on 6 August 2010 Southend's embargo was lifted allowing Gilbert to be registered with the Roots Hall club. Gilbert had previously played under Southend boss Paul Sturrock at Sheffield Wednesday and Plymouth Argyle.

Gilbert picked up an ankle injury in a pre season game against Derby County which forced him to miss the start of the league season. He finally made his debut for the club on 24 August 2010 against Wolverhampton Wanderers in the League Cup. Gilbert made his league debut in Southend's 2–0 win against Bradford City on 27 August 2010. After a 2011–12 season which ended in playoff defeat, the club did not offer Gilbert a new contract.

Gilbert joined Conference National club Lincoln City on non-contract terms in October 2012. He went on to sign a short-term contract which was later extended to the end of the season. At the end of March, he joined Dagenham & Redbridge on loan until the end of the season. In January 2014, he signed for Northern Premier League First Division South club Goole, managed by his former teammate Curtis Woodhouse. Later that year, he travelled to California where he played in two friendly matches for USL Pro club Sacramento Republic.

Coaching career 
After the end of his playing career, Gilbert joined West Bromwich Albion Academy as a coach. Working with various age groups over an eight-year spell – ultimately acting as U18s manager from 2019 to 2022.

In August 2022, Gilbert joined Aston Villa Academy as an Under-21s coach.

Honours
Plymouth Argyle
Football League Second Division: 2003–04

Career statistics

References

External links

1983 births
Living people
Footballers from Newcastle upon Tyne
English footballers
Welsh footballers
Wales under-21 international footballers
Association football defenders
Birmingham City F.C. players
Plymouth Argyle F.C. players
Leicester City F.C. players
Sheffield Wednesday F.C. players
Doncaster Rovers F.C. players
Oldham Athletic A.F.C. players
Northampton Town F.C. players
Southend United F.C. players
Lincoln City F.C. players
Dagenham & Redbridge F.C. players
Goole A.F.C. players
English Football League players
National League (English football) players
Northern Premier League players
Association football coaches
West Bromwich Albion F.C. non-playing staff
Aston Villa F.C. non-playing staff